The 2021–22 Irish Cup (known as the Samuel Gelston's Whiskey Irish Cup for sponsorship purposes) was the 142nd edition of the premier knock-out cup competition in Northern Irish football since its inauguration in 1881. The competition began on 7 August 2021 and concluded with the final at Windsor Park, Belfast on 7 May 2022.

Linfield were the defending champions, having defeated Larne 2–1 in the previous season's final. This season, they were defeated by Larne in the second round.

Crusaders were the winners, defeating Ballymena United 2–1 in the first ever meeting between the two teams in the final, and qualified for the 2022–23 UEFA Europa Conference League first qualifying round.

Format and schedule
128 clubs entered this season's competition. This was a large increase on the 26 entrants for the previous season's competition, which was played in a condensed format as a result of the COVID-19 pandemic in Northern Ireland. This season, the stages of the cup were renamed. The first four rounds will now be known as qualifying rounds, with what was historically known as the fifth round now becoming the first round of the main competition. 104 clubs entered the draw for the first qualifying round. 80 of them were drawn to face each other in 40 ties, with the remaining 24 given byes into the second qualifying round. After two further knockout rounds, the eight winners from the fourth qualifying round will join the 24 clubs from the NIFL Premiership and NIFL Championship in the first round of the main competition.

Qualifying rounds
The league tier of each club at the time of entering the competition is listed in parentheses.
(1) = NIFL Premiership
(2) = NIFL Championship
(3) = NIFL Premier Intermediate League
(NL) = Non-league (clubs outside the Northern Ireland Football League – levels 4–7)

First qualifying round
The draw for the first qualifying round took place on 20 July 2021, with the matches played on 7 and 14 August 2021. 104 clubs from level 3 and below entered the draw for the first qualifying round. 80 of them were randomly drawn to face each other in 40 ties.

The remaining 24 clubs, namely: 18th Newtownabbey Old Boys (NL), Ballynahinch Olympic (NL), Bangor (3), Bloomfield (NL), Colin Valley (NL), Comber Recreation (NL), Crewe United (NL), Downshire Young Men (NL), Drumaness Mills (NL), Dunmurry Young Men (NL), Glebe Rangers (NL), Immaculata (NL), Kilmore Recreation (NL), Laurelvale (NL), Lisburn Rangers (NL), Markethill Swifts (NL), Mossley (NL), Newington (3), Oxford Sunnyside (NL), Rathfriland Rangers (NL), St James' Swifts (NL), St Mary's (NL), Strabane Athletic (NL) and Tandragee Rovers (NL) all received byes into the second qualifying round.

|-
|colspan="3" style="background:#E8FFD8;"|7 August 2021
|-

|-
|colspan="3" style="background:#E8FFD8;"|14 August 2021
|-

|}

|}

Second qualifying round
64 clubs entered the second qualifying round; the 40 winners from the first qualifying round, along with the 24 clubs that received byes. The matches were played on 24 and 25 September 2021. Mossley, originally drawn to face Wellington Recreation or Donegal Celtic, were given a bye into the third qualifying round after both clubs were dismissed from the competition.

|-
|colspan="3" style="background:#E8FFD8;"|24 September 2021
|-

|-
|colspan="3" style="background:#E8FFD8;"|25 September 2021
|-

|}

|}

Third qualifying round
32 clubs entered the third qualifying round; the 30 winners from the second qualifying round matches, along with Sirocco Works who received a walkover after their opponents withdrew, and Mossley who received a bye. The matches were played on 30 October 2021.

|}

Fourth qualifying round
The 16 third qualifying round winners entered the fourth qualifying round. The matches were played on 27 November 2021. The eight winners from this round qualified for the first round of the main competition.

|}

Main competition

First round
32 clubs entered the first round of the main competition; the 24 clubs from levels 1 and 2 (the NIFL Premiership and NIFL Championship), along with the eight clubs that progressed through the four qualifying rounds. The matches were played on 7 and 8 January 2022.

|-
|colspan="3" style="background:#E8FFD8;"|7 January 2022
|-

|-
|colspan="3" style="background:#E8FFD8;"|8 January 2022
|-

|}

Second round
The second round draw was made on 8 January 2022. The 16 first round winners entered the second round. The matches are due to be played on 4, 5 and 15 February 2022.

|-
|colspan="3" style="background:#E8FFD8;"|4 February 2022

|-
|colspan="3" style="background:#E8FFD8;"|5 February 2022

|-
|colspan="3" style="background:#E8FFD8;"|15 February 2022

|}

Quarter-finals
The 8 second round winners entered the quarter-finals. The matches were played on 4 and 5 March 2022.

Semi-finals
The 4 quarter-final winners entered the semi-finals. The matches were played on 1 and 26 April 2022. Both semi-finals were originally scheduled to take place on 1 April. However, the match between Newry City and Ballymena United was delayed as a result of Glentoran's appeal against their expulsion from the competition.

Final
Ballymena United and Crusaders competed in an Irish Cup final for the first time. Ballymena United were runners-up against Glentoran in 2020, while Crusaders' last appearance in the final was in 2019, winning the cup with a 3–0 win over Ballinamallard United. The final was played on 7 May 2022 at Windsor Park, Belfast.

Notes

References

2021–22
Cup
2021–22 European domestic association football cups